Alvand Rural District is in the Central District of Khorramdarreh County, Zanjan province, Iran. At the National Census of 2006, its population was 873 in 188 households. There were 698 inhabitants in 189 households at the following census of 2011. At the most recent census of 2016, the population of the rural district was 691 in 214 households. The largest of its seven villages was Alvand, with 380 people.

References 

Khorramdarreh County

Rural Districts of Zanjan Province

Populated places in Zanjan Province

Populated places in Khorramdarreh County